Shali (also Romanized as Shālī and Shāllī; also known as Chāli, Chaly, Salī, and Sāllī) is a village in Mavazekhan-e Shomali Rural District, Khvajeh District, Heris County, East Azerbaijan Province, Iran. At the 2006 census, its population was 49, in 14 families.

References 

Populated places in Heris County